The Dragon Experience is an album by Canadian musicians cEvin Key and Ken Marshall released in 2003.

The model on the cover is Spencer Elden, who was also the baby on the cover of Nirvana's 1991 album Nevermind.

Track listing 

"Shortwave Connector"  – 5:14
"Diagnosis"  – 3:46
"Destructor Beam"  – 3:53
"Running" (Back & Forth)  – 4:08
"Metamorphosis (Theme from the Trial)"  – 4:24
"Maniac Shuffle"  – 3:38
"The Chamber"  – 3:48
"Skeletal Mask"  – 5:20
"Dr Seymour"  – 5:34
"Incandescent Glow"  – 3:34 
"Ambient Fruit (Chapter 2)"  – 10:31

Personnel
cEvin Key - synthesizer, guitar, bass guitar, drums, percussion, drum machine, tape loops, production
 Ken Marshall - production

Credits
Artwork by Simon Paul
Mastered by Brad Vance
Photography by Bree Thompson and cEvin Key
Produced and Engineered by Ken "hiwatt" Marshall and cEvin Key
Written by Ken "hiwatt" Marshall and cEvin Key
Controller - Spencer Elden

Notes
From The Vault series part 8.

Original pieces written/recorded by cEvin Key at Dog House Studios, 1045 Haro #407 Vancouver Canada 1984-1985

Reworked, produced and assembled at hiwattlabs Los Angeles 2003

External links
The Dragon Experience at Discogs.com

2003 albums
CEvin Key albums
Subconscious Communications albums
Metropolis Records albums